The German Longhaired Pointer (GLP) is a breed of dog. Developed in Germany, it is used as a multipurpose gundog. It is closely related to its cousins, the German Shorthaired Pointer (GSP), the German Wirehaired Pointer (GWP) and the Large Münsterländer, which was previously part of the breed.

Description

Appearance
The GLP should be muscular, elegant, and athletic. It should not be bulky or cumbersome, and it should be able to move with great speed and freedom. It has moderate bone, but has substance, and must never look frail or weak.  Like all German pointers, they have webbed feet. Puppies in their early years must be monitored for aggression.

Coat and color
The coat is slightly wavy, but must not be curly. It is not silky or soft, but rather firm and shiny. It always has a double coat, with the undercoat being quite dense, but not so profuse as to make the guard hairs stand out from the body. The color is solid brown with white permitted on the chest, paws, and down the top of the muzzle, or dark brown roan, with large patches of solid brown, especially on the head, ears, back, and base of the tail.

Size

Gait
The strides should be long and free, with strong drive from the hindquarters, and good reach from the front.

Temperament
GLPs are a kind, gentle, friendly, and intelligent breed. They are very affectionate, and may experience separation anxiety. They only make good pets when properly exercised, as they need a "job" to do, and do not adapt well to a sedentary life. The GLP is an excellent family pet, as it enjoys playing with children. It is very sociable with dogs.

Care
The GLP is very trainable, and loves to work. Because of this, it needs large amounts of exercise daily, needing more than most pet owners can give. It is not well suited for urban life, as it thrives on having plentiful room to run and swim. Its ideal setting would be in a rural area, with an active owner who hunts with the dog on a regular basis. GLPs need a moderate amount of grooming about once or twice a week. They are highly intelligent, very trainable, and athletic, traits which make them suitable for many dog sports, especially field trials, obedience, and agility.

Health
Because they are quite rare in most parts of the world, GLPs are unprofitable to irresponsible breeders such as puppy mills and backyard breeders, and do not have any genetic disorders prevalent in the breed. Their ears are mildly prone to infection, a problem which is easily avoided by cleaning the dog's ears on a regular basis, as well as after swimming.

History

The GLP was developed in Germany for use as a pointer. It was originally a rather slow dog, and was crossed with setters and English Pointers in the 19th century to improve speed. It was very stubborn and temperamental, and has since been bred for a steady, friendly temperament. It was first shown in 1878 in Frankfurt, at which time the first breed standard was written. Breeders then began to focus their efforts on producing dogs that performed equally well in the field and the show ring, an endeavour continued by breeders today.

Function became preferred over form.  As Karl Brandt, an early expert and theorist on this breed and its precursors, wrote in the llustrierten Jagdzeitung (1883) that: "At field competitions (trials), which should be part of breeding programs, the dogs will hopefully prove that they have not lost their natural hunting ability during the years when only looks dictated breeding" (i.e, pre 1878.)  five genealogical sires, constituting separate but parallel lines, are within the Longhair breed.

Like most of the longhaired pointing breeds, the breed is descended from the point spaniel. One of the oldest of the "versatile breeds", it is but one of a few that disallow black as a color. The Large Munsterlander was developed from the GLP after it was decided that GLPs must only be brown-and-white (there were thoughts that coloration also involved some undesirable characteristics); the black-and-white strain became the ancestors of the Large Munsterlander.

This breed now is a multipurpose field dog that combines: pointer, retriever (including water work), setter and tracker (of wounded game).

Breeding lines have been recorded in the Foundation Stock Service since May 2010; and effective July 1, 2011 the breed is approved to compete in AKC Performance Events.

See also

 Dogs portal
 List of dog breeds
 German shorthaired pointer
 German wirehaired pointer

References

Further reading

External links

 German Longhaired Pointer at DMOZ
 German Longhaired Pointer Club
 
 

Dog breeds originating in Germany
FCI breeds
Gundogs
Pointers
Rare dog breeds